The Cookes Range  (Cooke's Range, Cooks Range or Cook's Range)  is a small, 17-mi (27 km) long mountain range in northern Luna County, New Mexico, which extends slightly north into southeastern Grant County. The range is a southern continuation of the Mimbres Mountains, itself the southeast portion of the extensive north–south running Black Range. The Cookes Range is surrounded by lower elevation areas of the northwest Chihuahuan Desert.

Description
Cookes Range is about 17 mi long, and about 8 mi at its widest. The range is a basin and range north-south trending uplift with a center-north section intruded by granodiorite which forms Cookes Peak, . Cookes Peak is at the head of OK Canyon, which exits the range eastwards. South of OK Canyon is a transverse ridgeline, across the range west to east, named Rattlesnake Ridge. Other outlying lower elevation hills occur, east and west, in the north section, as the Cookes Range merges into the lower elevations of the Mimbres Mountains section of the Black Range.

History
The range was named after its prominent peak, which in turn was named after Captain Philip St. George Cooke of the Mormon Battalion. Cookes Spring was a station on the Butterfield Trail.

Fort Cummings (1863–1873, 1880–1886), located in the southeastern foothills of the range near Cookes Spring was established to restrict Mimbreño Apache raiding.

Silver was discovered in the range north of Cooks Peak in 1876, and the Cooks Peak Mining District was established in 1880. Silver, lead, and zinc were mined there until 1967.

Environment and ecology
The higher elevations of the range are pinon-juniper shrublands habitat which gives way to Chihuahuan desert in the foothills.  The Cookes Range Wilderness Study Area is located in the range.

See also
 Battle of Cookes Canyon

References

External links

Peaks

Cookes Range
 
 NMBGMR, Bureau of Geology and Mineral Resources, Cookes Peak, Cookes Range, maps & photo gallery

Mountain ranges of New Mexico
Landforms of Luna County, New Mexico
Mountain ranges of Grant County, New Mexico